The 1986–87 season was Leeds United's 60th season in the Football League, and their fifth consecutive season in the Football League Second Division, the second tier of English football, where they finished 4th, qualifying for the Football League Second Division play-offs, where they lost in the final to Charlton Athletic. Alongside the Second Division, the club competed in the FA Cup and the Football League Cup, being eliminated in the semi-finals of the former and the second round of the latter.

Background
Leeds United had played in the second tier of English football since they were relegated in the 1981–82 season.  Billy Bremner had been appointed as their manager in October 1985, replacing Eddie Grey.  After leading the club to 14th position in the league that season, Bremner made a number of changes to playing staff, including bringing in at least ten players.  Along with the fourth-place finish in the league, Bremner oversaw Leeds' run to the semi-final of the 1986–87 FA Cup where they lost to Sheffield Wednesday.

Season summary

Competitions

Second Division

League table

Matches

Source:

Play-offs

FA Cup

Source:

League Cup

Source:

Full Members' Cup

Source:

Notes

References

1986-87
English football clubs 1986–87 season